Katrina Elam is the self-titled debut studio album by American country music artist Katrina Elam. It was released in 2004 (see 2004 in country music) on the Universal South Records label. The album peaked at No. 42 on the Billboard Top Country Albums chart and No. 33 on the Top Heatseekers chart. It also produced two singles in "No End in Sight" and "I Want a Cowboy", which respectively reached No. 29 and No. 59 on the Hot Country Singles & Tracks chart.

After the release of Katrina Elam, Elam recorded a second album for Universal South in 2007, entitled Turn Me Up. Although two of this album's tracks charted, the album itself was not released, and Elam exited Universal South's roster.

Track listing

Personnel
Tim Akers – piano, Hammond organ, clavinet, accordion
David Angell – strings, background vocals
Monisa Angell – strings, background vocals
Robin Lee Bruce – background vocals
J. T. Corenflos – electric guitar
Eric Darken – percussion
David Davidson – strings, background vocals, string arrangements
Chip Davis – background vocals
Stuart Duncan – fiddle
Katrina Elam – lead vocals, background vocals, percussion
Shannon Forrest – drums
Paul Franklin – steel guitar
Aubrey Haynie – fiddle, mandolin
Wes Hightower – background vocals
Rob Ickes – Dobro
Gordon Kennedy – electric guitar
Wayne Kirkpatrick – percussion
Anthony LaMarchina – strings, background vocals
Chris McHugh – drums
Steve Nathan – piano, Hammond organ
Jimmie Lee Sloas – bass guitar
Steuart Smith – electric guitar
Bryan Sutton – acoustic guitar, banjo, mandolin
Dan Tyminski – background vocals
Keith Urban – electric guitar, ganjo
Jonathan Yudkin – strings, string arrangements

Chart performance

Album

Singles

References 

2004 debut albums
Katrina Elam albums
Show Dog-Universal Music albums
Albums produced by Jimmie Lee Sloas